The I.Ae. 16 "El Gaucho" is a nine-cylinder air-cooled radial aircraft engine, with a power of about . It was designed by the Aeronautic Institute (Instituto Aerotécnico, I.Ae.) of the Argentine Republic in 1943.

Design and development
The goal of I.Ae. 16 was to design an engine in the intermediate power range to equip general purpose aircraft, both civilian and military, that would be built by the Military Aircraft Factory. Due to the difficulty of importing materials because of World War II, it was designed to use only materials that could be produced in Argentina.

It was based on the Wright J-6/R-975 Whirlwind 9 engine with a displacement of 15.9 liters and in the  power range.

Production
There were a number of problems caused by its lack of experience, materials, and tools. This created difficulties in creating high quality metals with the required thermodynamic performance. About 300 units were produced.

Applications
I.Ae. 22 DL Advanced trainer
DINFIA IA 38 Experimental tailless transport aircraft

References

Notes

Bibliography

Further reading 
 

Aircraft air-cooled radial piston engines
1940s aircraft piston engines